JNCO, short for "Judge None Choose One", is a Los Angeles, California-based clothing company specializing in boys' and men's jeans.

History
JNCO was founded in 1985 by Moroccan-born, French-raised brothers Jacques Yaakov Revah and Haim Milo Revah. The brand gained recognition in the 1990s with its boys' ultra-wide straight legged denim jeans featuring elaborate pocket logos and a unique street look. The brothers commissioned a local LA graffiti artist Joseph Montalvo, aka Nuke, to design the brand's logo. This street look was popularized throughout the 90s starting in Los Angeles and working its way through the United States. JNCO also manufactures T-shirts, khaki pants and other clothing articles for men and women. Unlike similar California based apparel manufacturers, JNCO manufactured most of its products in the United States, mainly at S.M.J. American Manufacturing Co., a  operation also owned by Milo and Jacques Revah.

After peak sales of $186.9 million, sales halved in 1999. In the 2000s, the brothers closed the main factory.

In 2015, the brand was relaunched, backed by Chinese investment firm Guotai Litian, which acquired it for a reported seven-figure amount. However the new products were reported to be of lower quality, which resulted in increased demand for the original jeans on secondary marketplaces such as eBay.

On February 15, 2018, it was announced that JNCO was to cease production and liquidate its inventory. It was later clarified that this applied to the then-current licensed production under Guotai Litian, and that the brand would continue under new management.

In 2019, original founder Milo Revah announced he had re-acquired the brand and intended to relaunch it alongside his daughter Camilla. This second relaunch took place on June 28 of that year, along with a new website.

Styles
After JNCOs grew in popularity, department store chains such as Kohl's and J. C. Penney as well as mall retail stores such as Tops and Bottoms began to carry them. Other stores selling JNCOs were Gadzooks and Pacific Sunwear.

Some were so large that younger children often had to sit down while putting them on. After reaching the height of its popularity within the subcultures and becoming more mainstream, JNCOs were known for featuring superfluously large back pockets with graffiti-like inspired artwork embroidery that became more cartoonish as the 1990s ended including flaming skulls and the "JNCO Crown" (previously the majority of styles only had a relatively small stylized "J"). Some names of JNCO styles included Mammoths, Crime Scenes, FlameHead (geared for kids and teens), Mad Scientists, Buddha, Tribals and Rhinos, Twin Cannons,  and Kangaroos, which had  leg openings and extremely large back pockets, featured embroidery of a kangaroo with boxing gloves above the right rear pocket.

References

External links
 
 Jncojeans.com (Archive)

1990s fashion
Clothing brands of the United States
Clothing companies established in 1985
Manufacturing companies based in Los Angeles
Jeans by brand
Companies that filed for Chapter 11 bankruptcy in 1994